Laxman Narasimhan (born 15 April 1967) is an Indian-American business executive who was chief commercial officer (CCO) of PepsiCo, and chief executive officer (CEO) of Reckitt. He joined Starbucks under the title "interim CEO" in October 2022, and following the transition will succeed interim CEO Howard Schultz on April 1, 2023.

Early life 
Narasimhan was raised in Pune, India. He earned a degree in mechanical engineering from the College of Engineering, Pune, an MA in German and International Studies from The Lauder Institute at the University of Pennsylvania, and an MBA in Finance from the Wharton School at the University of Pennsylvania.

Career 
Narasimhan worked for McKinsey for 19 years until 2012, rising to director and location manager for their New Delhi office. In 2012, he joined PepsiCo, rising to chief commercial officer.

Narasimhan succeeded Rakesh Kapoor as CEO of Reckitt Benckiser in September 2019, formulating a turnaround plan which was intended to rejuvenate the company "following a series of missteps and lacklustre growth that marked the final years of his predecessor". However, in September 2022 the company unexpectedly announced his resignation, citing "personal and family reasons".

On September 1, 2022, Starbucks announced that Narasimhan will become the company's next CEO. He will succeed Howard Schultz, who has served as interim CEO since Kevin Johnson resigned in March 2022.

Personal life 
Narasimhan is married, with two children, and lives in Greenwich, Connecticut. He speaks six languages.

See also 
 Indian Americans in the New York City metropolitan area

References 

Living people
Reckitt people
PepsiCo people
Wharton School of the University of Pennsylvania alumni
American chief executives
Indian emigrants to the United States
American people of Indian descent
Savitribai Phule Pune University alumni
McKinsey & Company people
1967 births
Indian expatriates in the United Kingdom